Manjakkal is a ward of Mahé municipality. It forms a part of the enclave Mahe district of Puducherry in India.

References 
 

Enclaves and exclaves
Mahe district